Jenny Choy Tsi Jen is a Malaysian politician who has served as Deputy Speaker of the Perak State Legislative Assembly since December 2022 and Member of the Perak State Legislative Assembly (MLA) for Canning since May 2018. She is a member of the Democratic Action Party (DAP), a component party of the Pakatan Harapan (PH) coalition.

Early career 
She is a software engineer and has worked in Malay-Sino Chemical Industries Sdn. Bhd from 2010 to 2011 and in Kuala Kepong Berhad from 2011 to 2018. She is a Bachelor of Business Information Systems (Computer Science) from Sunway University and Bachelor of Business Administration. Besides that, she has NCC International Advanced Diploma in Computer Studies.

Political career 
She joined Democratic Action Party in 2008 and was the political secretary for Wong Kah Woh. She was National Vice Chief of DAP Socialist Youth from 2018 to 2021.

Election results

External links

References 

Democratic Action Party (Malaysia) politicians
Members of the Perak State Legislative Assembly
Malaysian people of Chinese descent
Living people
1988 births